Andriy Sukhetskyi (born February 11, 1993) is a Ukrainian footballer playing with FC Ukraine United in the Ontario Soccer League.

Playing career 
Sukhetskyi played in the Ukrainian Amateur Football League in 2010 with FC Sokil Zolochiv. In 2011, he played abroad in the IV liga with KS Hetman Włoszczowa. Throughout his tenure in the IV liga he played with M.K.S. Orlicz Suchedniów, M.K.S. Pilica Przedbórz, and M.K.S. Halniak Maków Podhalański. In 2016, he returned to the Ukrainian Amateur Football League to play with FC Nyva Ternopil, and later with FC Agron-OTG. In 2017, he played in the Ukrainian Second League with FC Ternopil.

The following season he played with Nyva Terebovlya. In 2019, for a second time he played abroad in the Canadian Soccer League with FC Ukraine United. He featured in the CSL Championship final against Scarborough SC, but in a losing effort. He played in the Ontario Soccer League in 2021 with Ukraine United.

References 
 

1993 births
Living people
Ukrainian footballers
FC Sokil Zolochiv players
FC Nyva Ternopil players
FC Ternopil players
FC Ukraine United players
Canadian Soccer League (1998–present) players
Association football defenders
Expatriate footballers in Poland
IV liga players
Ukrainian Second League players